"Badd" is the second single from the Ying Yang Twins' album U.S.A. (United State of Atlanta). It features Mike Jones and Mr. Collipark. In 2006 it reached number 6 on the Hot Rap Songs chart and number 29 on the Billboard Hot 100. The song was produced by Mr. Collipark. The music video is set inside various casinos and hotels in Las Vegas.

The song was covered in 2006 by Richard Cheese and Lounge Against the Machine for the album The Sunny Side of the Moon: The Best of Richard Cheese.

Charts

Weekly charts

Year-end charts

References

2005 singles
2005 songs
Ying Yang Twins songs
Mike Jones (rapper) songs
TVT Records singles
Songs written by Mr. Collipark
Songs written by Mike Jones (rapper)
Crunk songs